Twin Cities Phoenix, originally known as Twin Cities Tornado until 2000, were an American soccer team, founded in 1997, who were members of the United Soccer Leagues Premier Development League (PDL), the fourth tier of the American Soccer Pyramid, until 2001, after which the team left the league and the franchise was terminated.

Year-by-year

Defunct soccer clubs in Minnesota
Defunct Premier Development League teams
1997 establishments in Minnesota
2001 disestablishments in Minnesota